Sarra is a Palestinian town in the Nablus Governorate in northern West Bank, located 11 kilometers southwest of Nablus. According to the Palestinian Central Bureau of Statistics (PCBS), the town had a population of 2,892 inhabitants in mid-year 2006.

Location
Sarra is located 17.8 km west of Nablus. It is bordered by Nablus and Tell to the east, Beit Wazan and Beit Iba to the north, Jit to the west, and Tell to the south.

History
A grave, dating from the Roman Empire era in Palestine, was found looted just outside  Serra.

Ottoman era
In 1517, the village was included in the Ottoman empire with the rest of Palestine, and it appeared in the 1596 tax-records as Sarra, located in the Nahiya of Jabal Qubal of the Liwa of Nablus. The population was 19 households and 10 bachelor, all Muslim. They paid a fixed tax rate of 33.3% on agricultural products, such as wheat, barley, summer crops, olive trees, goats and beehives, in addition to occasional revenues and a fixed tax for people of Nablus area; a total of 1,549 akçe.

During the 1834 Peasants' revolt in Palestine, Musa Bek Toukan besieged  Qasim al-Ahmad at Kuriet Surra, but Qasim al-Ahmad broke free, and pursued his besieging forces all the way back to Nablus.

In 1838, Surra was located in the District of Jurat 'Amra, south of Nablus.

In 1863 Victor Guérin found it to have 500 inhabitants.

In 1882, the PEF's Survey of Western Palestine described Surra as: "A small village in a hollow, with a spring on the south east, surrounded by olives."

British Mandate era
In the 1922 census of Palestine conducted by the British Mandate authorities, Sarra had a population of 277 Muslims, increasing in the 1931 census to 382 Muslims, in a total of 106 houses.

In the 1945 statistics the population was 540 (all Muslim), while the total land area was 5,928 dunams, according to an official land and population survey. 
Of this, 540 dunams were for plantations and irrigable land, 3,513 for cereals, while 34 dunams were classified as built-up areas.

Jordanian era
In the wake of the 1948 Arab–Israeli War, and after the 1949 Armistice Agreements, Surra came  under  Jordanian rule.

The Jordanian census of 1961 found 767 inhabitants.

Post-1967
Since the Six-Day War in 1967, Surra has been held under Israeli occupation along with the rest of the Palestinian territories.

After the 1995 accords 42% of the village land was classified as Area A, 43% classified as Area B, and the remaining 15% classified as Area C.

Sarra has suffered from several reported Israeli price tag attacks:
 4 March 2011: Israeli settlers from Shvut Rachel damaged roughly 500 olive trees belonging to the village, and stoned homes, apparently in reprisal for the dismantling of several mobile homes.
 25 July 2011: Settlers torched the farmlands of the village,  after Israeli soldiers intervened to stop Israeli peace activists from preventing a group of settlers from uprooting trees, according to IMEMC.

References

Bibliography

External links
  Welcome to Sarra
Sarra, Welcome to Palestine
Survey of Western Palestine, Map 11:    IAA, Wikimedia commons  
Sarra village profile,  Applied Research Institute–Jerusalem (ARIJ)
 Sarra, aerial photo, ARIJ
  Sarra village

Nablus Governorate
Villages in the West Bank
Municipalities of the State of Palestine